Thomas Thynne (1647/8–12 February 1682) was an English landowner of the family that is now headed by the Marquess of Bath and politician who sat in the House of Commons from 1670 to 1682. He went by the nickname "Tom of Ten Thousand" due to his great wealth. He was a friend of the Duke of Monmouth, a relationship referred to in John Dryden's satirical work Absalom and Achitophel where Thynne is described as "Issachar, his wealthy western friend".

Thynne was the son of Sir Thomas Thynne, and his wife Stuarta Balquanquill, daughter of Dr. Walter Balquanquill. His father was a younger son of Sir Thomas Thynne of Longleat, Wiltshire.  In 1670 Thynne succeeded to the family estates at Longleat on the death of his uncle Sir James Thynne without issue. He also succeeded his uncle as Member of Parliament for Wiltshire, and sat until his death in 1682. 
 
On 15 November 1681 Thynne married the wealthy Lady Elizabeth Percy, only child of Joceline Percy, 11th Earl of Northumberland, who was then aged 14. The couple were married less than a year.

Death
Thynne was murdered on 12 February 1682 after the Swedish Count Karl Johann von Königsmark began to pursue his wife. Count Karl von Königsmark was the brother of Count Philip Christoph von Königsmarck who disappeared under mysterious circumstances in the state of Hanover in Germany in 1694, possibly murdered by order of the future British monarch George I, with whose wife, Sophia Dorothea of Celle, he was having a notorious affair.

Thynne was shot while riding in his coach in Pall Mall, London, by three men, Christopher Vratz, John Stern and Charles George Borosky. It was strongly suspected that they were acting on the orders of Königsmark and the four were soon arrested, Vratz being captured by Sir John Reresby hiding at the house of a Swedish doctor in Leicester Fields (modern Leicester Square). Königsmark however was acquitted of the charge of being an accessory before the fact (due to the corruption of the jury according to diarist John Evelyn) but Vratz, Stern and Borosky were hanged on 10 March 1682. 

Thynne's remains were interred in a marble tomb in Westminster Abbey. The tomb which was sculpted by Arnold Quellin, is decorated in part with a representation of the murder of Thynne in 1682. A popular ballad summed up the episode in form of a mock epitaph:

After Thynne's death, his widow, Lady Elizabeth, married Charles Seymour, 6th Duke of Somerset.

References

 
 

1648 births
1682 deaths
Thomas
English murder victims
People murdered in Westminster
Burials at Westminster Abbey
17th-century English landowners
English MPs 1661–1679
English MPs 1679
English MPs 1680–1681
English MPs 1681
Assassinated English politicians
Members of the Parliament of England (pre-1707) for Wiltshire
Deaths by firearm in London
Murder in 1682